Sarojini Babar (Devanagari: सरोजिनी बाबर) (January 7, 1920 – April 20, 2008) was a Marathi writer and a politician from Maharashtra, India.

Dr.Babar was born on  January 7, 1920, in the town of Bagani in Sangli District of  Maharashtra. After finishing her high school studies in Islampur, she joined S.P College in Pune and secured her bachelor's degree from Mumbai University in 1944. Subsequently, she obtained her master's and doctoral degrees also from Mumbai University.

She was a member of the legislative assembly of Maharashtra state during 1952–57 and 1963–66. She was a member of Indian Rajya Sabha during 1968–74.Dr Babar  was the chairman of the Maharashtra State Folklore Committee, Maharashtra Sahitya Parishad and Maharashtra Lok Sahitya Parishad.

Since 1950, for many years Babar was the editor of Samaj Shikshan Mala (समाज शिक्षण माला) magazine.Since1961,

The Maharashtra state government instituted MRLS in 1953 to see to the cultural enrichment of Marathi people through literature. Since 1961, Dr Babar was the head of the Maharashtra Rajya Loksahitya Samiti (MRLS) for 32 years.

Literary work

Novels
 Kamalache Jale (कमळाचं जाळं) (1946)
 Ajita (अजिता) (1953)
 Athawatey Tewadhe Sangate (आठवतंय तेवढं सांगते) (1955)
 Swayamwar (स्वयंवर) (1979)

Collection of poems
 Jholana (झोळणा) (1964)

Other works
 Wanita Saraswat (वनिता सारस्वत) (1961)
 Stri Shikshanachi Watchal (स्त्रीशिक्षणाची वाटचाल) (1968) 
 Striyanche Khel Ani Gani (स्त्रियांचे खेळ आणि गाणी) (1977)
 Mi Pahilele Yashawantrao (मी पाहिलेले यशवंतराव) (1988) 
 Karagiri (कारागिरी) (1992)
 Rajvilasi Kevda (1969/1970) includes poem by Smt Mandakini Shankarrao Thorat

1920 births
2008 deaths
Marathi-language writers
Marathi politicians
People from Sangli district
Rajya Sabha members from Maharashtra
Maharashtra MLAs 1962–1967
Women members of the Maharashtra Legislative Assembly
20th-century Indian women writers
20th-century Indian writers
Women writers from Maharashtra
20th-century Indian women politicians
20th-century Indian politicians
Women members of the Rajya Sabha